Downtown Sacramento is the central business district of the city of Sacramento. Downtown is generally defined as the area south of the American River, east of the Sacramento River, north of Broadway, and west of 16th Street. The central business district is generally defined as north of R Street, south of H Street, east of the Sacramento River, and west of 16th Street. Downtown Sacramento is currently undergoing a major revitalization project.

Government
 United States representative: 
 State senator: 
 Assemblymember: 
 City Mayor: Darrell Steinberg

Streets
The streets in downtown Sacramento use a numbered and lettered grid system.  These lettered streets run north and south, and numbered streets are oriented as west and east. The exceptions to this include Capitol Mall and Capitol Avenue, which are equivalent of M Street; Front Street located in Old Sacramento, which is equivalent to 1st Street; Broadway, which is equivalent to Y Street, and Alhambra Boulevard, which is equivalent to 31st Street.

Major features
Included within downtown is the California State Capitol building, the house of the California state government. The major retail and entertainment area is known as the Downtown Commons (DOCO), which includes Macy's, the Sawyer Hotel, the Golden 1 Center (home of the Sacramento Kings NBA team), and a wide variety of dining establishments. The recently renovated and expanded Sacramento City Hall is also located downtown. The Sacramento Convention Center Complex is a major events venue downtown. The recently renovated Cathedral of the Blessed Sacrament located at 11th and K Streets. It is the largest historical cathedral west of the Sacramento River. Homeless Haven in the River District has a large homeless population.

Pedestrian malls

K Street, the city's former main shopping, dining, and entertainment street, was closed to all automobile traffic between 1969 and November 12, 2011, between 13th Street and Westfield Downtown Plaza. In November, 2012, the K Street Mall was rebranded as "The Kay", and now functions as a shopping area.

Two half-block long pedestrian malls still exist in downtown, on 11th Street between J-K Alley and The Kay, and from The Kay to K-L Alley.

Transportation

The Sacramento Regional Transit provides light rail and bus service through downtown. Interstate 5 separates Old Sacramento State Historic Park from the western edge of downtown.  The State Route 160 (15th and 16th Streets) borders the eastern edge of downtown on a pair of one-way surface streets. The historic Sacramento Valley Amtrak Station is located downtown just north of Westfield Downtown Plaza, and is serviced by Amtrak Capitol Corridor and three other routes, in addition to being the western terminus of the Gold light rail line.  The return of streetcars to downtown is currently being evaluated in a joint effort by both Sacramento and West Sacramento. Interstate 80, Interstate 80 Business (Capital City Freeway), California State Route 99 and U.S. Route 50 all intersect in the area.

Hotels
There are many major hotels located in the downtown area of Sacramento. A Hyatt Regency and a Sheraton Grand are located near the State Capitol and the Embassy Suites is located west in the downtown area, closer to the Sacramento River and the Crocker Art Museum. A mid-rise Holiday Inn is located off of Interstate 5, near Old Sacramento.  A 230-room, 15-story Residence Inn by Marriott is located at 15th and L Streets, which is on the northeast corner of Capitol Park. The Citizen Hotel is a 200-room Sacramento boutique hotel, located in the old Cal West historic building at 10th and J Streets. In 2022, California State Parks commissioned a proposal for the development and construction of a new hotel in the grassy area near I Street and Front Street in Old Sacramento State Historic Park, and began the process of seeking public input to ensure the hotel is historically appropriate.

Restaurants
Numerous restaurants are located in the downtown area, including a Claim Jumper that recently opened in the restored Elks Lodge building at 11th and J Streets. Foundation Restaurant & Bar is located on the corner of 4th and L Streets, near many hotels, Macy's Department Store, and the new Kings Arena site.

Theatres
Near the convention center are the Crest Theatre at 10th and K Streets, and an IMAX theater at 13th and K Streets. The DoCo also has a large multiplex cinema. The Sacramento Community Center Theatre is located on 13th and L Streets, and has regular performances by Broadway Sacramento, Sacramento Philharmonic Orchestra, the Sacramento Opera, and The Sacramento Ballet. The UC Davis Health Pavilion (known as the Wells Fargo Pavilion from 2003 to 2021 and Music Circus prior to 2003), located on 14th and H Streets, provides a unique "theater in the round" live theater and musical experience. The historic Memorial Auditorium, at 16th and J Streets, holds many performances from comedy acts, traveling bands, and speakers. The Assembly Music Hall, located at 10th and K Streets, is a 200-seat venue, offering musical comedies in an upscale setting with table service.

Notable residents
 Jim Beall - California State Senator
 Jerry Brown - Former Governor of California had a unit in the Elliott Building
 Edward Hernandez - California State Senator
 Henry Stern - California State Senator

References

Downtown
Culture of Sacramento, California
Neighborhoods in Sacramento, California
Sacramento
Tourist attractions in Sacramento, California